Paul Stagg (March 18, 1909 – September 4, 1992) was an American football player, coach, and college athletics administrator.  He served as the head football coach at Moravian College (1934–1936), Springfield College (1937–1940), Worcester Polytechnic Institute (1941–1946), and Pacific University in Forest Grove, Oregon (1946–1960), compiling a career college football record of 94–99–12.  Stagg played football as a quarterback at the University of Chicago, where his father, Amos Alonzo Stagg, was the head coach.  He was an assistant coach under his father at Chicago in the fall of 1932 before graduating in December with a Bachelor of Science, majoring in geography.  He followed the elder Stagg in 1933 to the University of the Pacific in Stockton, California, where he served as an assistant coach for a season before taking the head coaching job at Moravian.  Paul Stagg returned to the University of the Pacific in 1961 as director of physical education and intercollegiate athletics, a capacity in which he served until 1967.

Stagg's older brother, Amos Jr., also played quarterback at Chicago under their father and was a later the head football coach at Susquehanna University.  The two brothers coached against one another twice.  In 1935, Amos Jr.'s Susquehanna Crusaders and Paul's Moravian Greyhounds played to a 0–0 tie in Bethlehem, Pennsylvania.  The following year, Moravian beat Susquehanna, 26–16, in Selinsgrove.

Marriage and graduate study
Stagg was married on August 13, 1934, to Virginia Russell in Chicago.  He received a Master of Arts degree in physical education from Columbia University that June.  In the spring of 1947, he received a PhD in physical education from New York University.

Head coaching record

Football

Further reading
Sumner, David E. Amos Alonzo Stagg: College Football's Greatest Pioneer (Jefferson, NC: McFarland Books, 2021).

References

External links
 

1909 births
1992 deaths
American football quarterbacks
Chicago Maroons football coaches
Chicago Maroons football players
Chicago Maroons men's tennis players
Moravian Greyhounds athletic directors
Moravian Greyhounds baseball coaches
Moravian Greyhounds football coaches
Moravian Greyhounds men's basketball coaches
New York University alumni
Pacific Boxers athletic directors
Pacific Boxers football coaches
Pacific Tigers athletic directors
Pacific Tigers football coaches
Springfield Pride football coaches
WPI Engineers football coaches
WPI Engineers men's basketball coaches
Columbia University alumni
Coaches of American football from Illinois
Players of American football from Chicago
Baseball coaches from Illinois
Basketball coaches from Illinois